Diego Henrique Costa Barbosa (born 21 July 1999) is a Brazilian professional footballer who plays as a centre-back for São Paulo FC.

Professional career
Diego Costa made his professional debut with São Paulo in a 2-1 Campeonato Brasileiro Série A win over CSA on 8 December 2019.

Statistics

Honours
São Paulo
Campeonato Paulista: 2021

References

External links
 
  Profile

1999 births
Living people
People from Campina Grande
Brazilian footballers
Association football defenders
São Paulo FC players
Campeonato Brasileiro Série A players
Sportspeople from Paraíba